In chemistry, the perbromate ion is the anion having the chemical formula . It is an oxyanion of bromine, the conjugate base of perbromic acid, in which bromine has the oxidation state +7. Unlike its chlorine and iodine analogs, it is difficult to synthesize. It has tetrahedral molecular geometry.

The term perbromate also refers to a compound that contains the  anion or the  functional group.

The perbromate ion is a strong oxidizing agent.  The reduction potential for the /Br− couple is +0.68 V at pH 14. This is comparable to selenite's reduction potential.

Synthesis
Attempted syntheses of perbromates were unsuccessful until 1968, when it was finally obtained by the beta decay of selenium-83 in a selenate salt:

 →  + β−

Later, it was obtained by the oxidation of bromate with xenon difluoride. Once perbromates are obtained, perbromic acid can be produced by protonating .

One effective method of producing perbromate is by the oxidation of bromate with fluorine under alkaline conditions:

 +  + 2  →  + 2  + 

This synthesis is much easier to perform on a large scale than the electrolysis route or oxidation by xenon difluoride.

In 2011 a new, more effective synthesis was discovered: perbromate ions were formed through the reaction of hypobromite and bromate ions in an alkaline sodium hypobromite solution.

Diperiodatonickelate anions in alkaline solution can oxidise bromate to perbromate. This is a relatively lower cost and fluorine free synthesis.

See also
Other bromine anions:

References

Perbromates